Connecticut's Historic Gardens are eleven historic gardens scattered across the American state of Connecticut.

Bellamy-Ferriday House and Garden, Bethlehem, Connecticut
Butler-McCook House and Garden, Hartford, Connecticut
Florence Griswold Museum, Old Lyme, Connecticut
Glebe House (Woodbury, Connecticut), Woodbury, Connecticut
Harkness Memorial State Park, Waterford, Connecticut
Harriet Beecher Stowe House, Hartford, Connecticut
Hill-Stead Museum, Farmington, Connecticut
Osborne Homestead Museum, Derby, Connecticut
Promisek/Beatrix Farrand Garden at Three Rivers Farm, Bridgewater, Connecticut
Roseland Cottage, Woodstock, Connecticut
Webb-Deane-Stevens Museum, Wethersfield, Connecticut

References

Connecticut's Historic Gardens

Historic Gardens
Landmarks in Connecticut